Unity is an unincorporated community in Adams County, Ohio, United States.

History
The post office, once located at Union, was first called Wheat Ridge, then Wheat. This post office was established in 1851 and remained in operation until 1906.

See also
Unity, Columbiana County, Ohio

References

Unincorporated communities in Adams County, Ohio
Unincorporated communities in Ohio
1851 establishments in Ohio
Populated places established in 1851